Maiak is an urban-type settlement in Makiivka Municipality (district) in Donetsk Oblast of eastern Ukraine. Population:

Demographics
Native language as of the Ukrainian Census of 2001:
 Ukrainian 14.74%
 Russian 84.93%
 Belarusian 0.33%

References

Urban-type settlements in Donetsk Raion